The Diocese of Waikato and Taranaki is one of the thirteen dioceses and hui amorangi (Maori bishoprics) of the Anglican Church in Aotearoa, New Zealand and Polynesia. The diocese covers the area from the Waikato to the area surrounding Mount Taranaki in the North Island of New Zealand.

The diocese was established in 1926 as the Diocese of Waikato, with Cecil Arthur Cherrington being the first bishop. In 2010, the name of the diocese was changed to the Diocese of Waikato and Taranaki. This reflects the structure of the diocese (since the passage of the Shared Diocesan Episcopacy Statute 2007), with two bishoprics and two co-ordinary (presiding) bishops. That statute was amended in 2017 (before Hartley's translation) to clarify that when one See is vacant, the other bishop also holds that See as sole diocesan bishop — as has been the case since 2018. With the diocese unable to afford two bishops, Richardson established a commission in December 2018 to review the dual-episcopacy arrangement.

The seat of the Bishop of Waikato is at St Peter's Cathedral in Hamilton.

The seat of the Bishop of Taranaki is at the Taranaki Cathedral Church of St Mary. The incumbent Bishop of Taranaki is Philip Richardson (who has been the archbishop of the New Zealand dioceses since 1 May 2013). Richardson had previously been the only suffragan Bishop in Taranaki in the Waikato diocese from 1999 until the co-diocesan arrangement started in 2008. Since Hartley's translation in 2018, he has been sole diocesan bishop, called Bishop of Waikato and Taranaki.

Bishops of Waikato
 Cecil Cherrington (1926–1951)
 John Holland (1951–1968)
 Allen Johnston (1968–1980; also Archbishop of New Zealand from 1972)
 Brian Davis (1980–1986; also Archbishop of New Zealand from 1986; translated to Wellington)
 Roger Herft (1986–1993)
 David Moxon (1993–2013; co-equal diocesan after 2008; senior bishop of the "New Zealand dioceses" from 2006; Co-Presiding Bishop / Pīhopa Aporei, 2006–2008 then Primate / Pīhopa Mātāmua and Archbishop, 2008 onwards)
 Helen-Ann Hartley (2014–2018; co-equal diocesan)
 vacant (2018–present; Richardson Bishop of Waikato and Taranaki)

Bishops of Taranaki
 Philip Richardson (co-equal diocesan 2008–present; previously suffragan Bishop in Taranaki, 1999–2008; senior diocese of the New Zealand dioceses, Primate / Pīhopa Mātāmua and Archbishop since 2013; Bishop of Waikato and Taranaki since 2018)

Parishes

Piako
Cambridge
Katikati
Mangakino
Matamata
Morrinsville
Paeroa
Putāruru
Tamahere
Te Aroha
Tīrau
Tokoroa
Waihi
Waihi Beach
Whangamatā

Taranaki
Bell Block
Brooklands
Eltham-Kaponga
Fitzroy
Hāwera
Inglewood
Manaia
Okato
Opunake
Patea
New Plymouth
Stratford
Waitara
Waverley-Waitotara
West New Plymouth

Waikato
Bryant Park
Hamilton - St Peters Cathedral
Chartwell
Claudelands
Forest Lake - Holy Trinity Church
West Hamilton
Hamilton East
Hillcrest
Huntly
Melville
Nawton
Ngāruawāhia
Raglan
Te Kauwhata

Waitomo
Kawhia
Orakau
Otorohanga
Piopio-Aria-Mokau
Taumarunui
Te Awamutu
Te Kuiti

References

External links
 Diocese of Waikato & Taranaki website
 St Peter's Cathedral website

Christian organizations established in 1926
Waikato
Waikato
Christianity in Hamilton, New Zealand